The  was a security checkpoint established during the Nara period on the ancient Tōkaidō highway connecting the capitals of Heijō-kyō and Heian-kyō with the eastern provinces of Japan. In 1921, the ruins of the Suzuka Barrier was recognized as a National Historic Site

Overview
The three barriers were established in the first or second year of the reign of Emperor Tenmu. During the Jinshin War, he had gained an important military advantage over his brother by seizing control of these access points to the capital and thus understood the strategic importances of these chokepoints. The Taihō Code in 701AD stipulated that barriers should have both police and military functions. Each was equipped with a garrison and armory, and was placed under the control of a kuge military officer with fourth Court Rank. The purpose of the barrier was not only to prevent invasion from the east, but was also to prevent any rebels from escaping the capital, The barriers were highly closed during times of potential political unrest, such as the illness or death of an emperor. The first time the barrier was actually closed was during the interregnum following the death of Empress Genmei in 722 AD. Other times included the rebellion of Prince Nagaya, the Fujiwara no Nakamaro Rebellion and Kusuko Incident. On the transfer of the capital to Heian-kyō in 789AD, Emperor Kanmu ordered the barriers to be abolished. However, although the troops were withdrawn, the barriers continued to exist, and closures of the gate are recorded at several times well into the middle of the Heian period.

The Suzuka Barrier guarded the pass between Iga Province and Ise Province on the main route between Heijō-kyō and the Ise Grand Shrine. In 794 AD, Emperor Kanmu ordered the construction of new road connecting Heian-kyō with the Saiō complex in Ise via the Suzuka Pass. Construction was difficult and the road was not completed until 886 AD under Emperor Kōkō. The ancient route was lost, and for many years the predominant theory was that the Edo period post station of Seki-juku on the Tōkaidō was the location of the ancient barrier. However, following the discovery of Nara period roof tiles in 2005, portions of a moated enclosure with earthen ramparts was discovered at the present location corresponding to a possible site of the ancient Suzuka Barrier. Archaeological excavations are ongoing and have thus far revealed the existence of a wall with a height of three meters extending 650 meters from north-to-south.

See also
List of Historic Sites of Japan (Mie)

References

External links
Kamyama city home page

Archaeological sites in Japan
History of Mie Prefecture
Ise Province
Historic Sites of Japan
Kameyama, Mie